Jean Charles Émile Taris (6 July 1909 – 10 January 1977) was a French swimmer who competed at the 1928, 1932 and 1936 Summer Olympics.

In 1928, he was eliminated in the heats of the 4×200 m freestyle relay and 1500 m freestyle. In 1932 he won a silver medal in the 400 m freestyle, 0.1 seconds behind Buster Crabbe, and finished sixth in the 1500 m freestyle. In 1936 he placed fourth in the 4×200 m freestyle relay and sixth in the 400 m freestyle.

Taris was the subject of Jean Vigo's short film Jean Taris, Swimming Champion in 1930. He won two European titles in 1934, and finished second in the 400 m freestyle in 1931, 0.2 seconds behind István Bárány. In 1984 he was inducted into the International Swimming Hall of Fame. During his career Taris set 7 world and 49 national records, and won 34 national titles. He won the Seine river 8 km race four times.

See also
 List of members of the International Swimming Hall of Fame
World record progression 400 metres freestyle
World record progression 800 metres freestyle

References

1909 births
1977 deaths
Sportspeople from Versailles, Yvelines
French male freestyle swimmers
Olympic swimmers of France
Swimmers at the 1928 Summer Olympics
Swimmers at the 1932 Summer Olympics
Swimmers at the 1936 Summer Olympics
Olympic silver medalists for France
World record setters in swimming
European Aquatics Championships medalists in swimming
Medalists at the 1932 Summer Olympics
Olympic silver medalists in swimming